Cameron Lindley (born July 18, 1997) is an American soccer player who plays as a midfielder for Indy Eleven in the USL Championship. Having played college soccer for the University of North Carolina at Chapel Hill, he joined Orlando City in 2018 after his Homegrown rights were traded from Chicago Fire.

Career

Youth and college
Lindley grew up in Carmel, Indiana and spent a majority of his youth career with Indiana Fire Juniors, Chicago Fire's youth soccer club. He played high school soccer and basketball at Guerin Catholic High School in Noblesville, Indiana. Following several seasons with the youth club, Lindley spent a season in the Premier Development League with Chicago FC United before attending college. He spent two years at the University of North Carolina at Chapel Hill, scoring seven goals in 43 regular season matches.

Professional
On January 18, 2018, Lindley's Homegrown rights were traded from Chicago Fire to Orlando City as Lindley signed a four-year deal with the Central Florida club. He made his professional debut in the season opener, a 1–1 draw at home to DC United. After starting three of the first four games of the season, Lindley failed to make another MLS appearance in 2018 and only made one US Open Cup appearance.

On May 24, 2018, he was loaned to Saint Louis FC and made one start before returning.

On April 12, 2019, he was loaned to USL Championship team Memphis 901 FC and made 26 appearances in all competitions. On November 21, 2019, it was announced Lindley had his contract option for the 2020 season declined by Orlando as part of the end-of-season roster decisions.

After a season with USL Championship side Indy Eleven in 2020, it was announced Lindley would be with San Antonio FC in 2021.

On December 9, 2021, it was announced that Lindley would join USL Championship side Colorado Springs Switchbacks ahead of their 2022 season. During the 2022 season, Lindley was named USL Championship All-League.

On December 1, 2022, Lindley made the move to his former club Indy Eleven ahead of the 2023 season.

International career 
Lindley has represented the United States internationally at various youth levels.

On March 19, 2019, Lindley was selected by his former Orlando City head coach Jason Kreis for the United States U23 squad for friendlies against Egypt and the Netherlands ahead of qualification for the Tokyo 2020 Olympics.

Personal life 
Lindley's younger sister, Cassidy, is also a soccer player currently at the University of Florida. His uncle, Tyler McCarroll, was a midfielder at Indiana.

Career statistics

College

Source

Club

Honors

Individual 
 Atlantic Coast Conference Men's Soccer Freshman of the Year: 2016
 Atlantic Coast Conference Midfielder of the Year: 2017
USL Championship All League Second Team: 2022

References

External links

 

1997 births
Living people
American soccer players
Association football midfielders
Chicago FC United players
Major League Soccer players
North Carolina Tar Heels men's soccer players
Orlando City SC players
People from Carmel, Indiana
Soccer players from Indiana
United States men's under-20 international soccer players
United States men's youth international soccer players
USL League Two players
Wilmington Hammerheads FC players
USL Championship players
Saint Louis FC players
Memphis 901 FC players
Indy Eleven players
San Antonio FC players
Colorado Springs Switchbacks FC players
All-American men's college soccer players
United States men's under-23 international soccer players